Atkins may refer to:

Places in the United States
 Atkins, Arkansas, a city
 Atkins, Iowa, a city
 Atkins, Louisiana, an unincorporated community
 Atkins, Nebraska, an unincorporated community
 Atkins, Virginia, a census-designated place
 Atkins, Wisconsin, an unincorporated community
 Atkins Peak, in Yellowstone National Park

Other uses

 Atkins (surname)
 Atkins Nutritional Approach, known as the Atkins diet
 Atkins Nutritionals, a producer of low-carbohydrate packaged foods
 Atkins, the largest engineering consultancy firm in the United Kingdom
 Atkins baronets, in the Baronetage of England
 Atkins High School, Winston-Salem, North Carolina, on the National Register of Historic Places
 Atkins v. Virginia, a case in which the United States Supreme Court ruled that executing individuals with intellectual disabilities violates the Eighth Amendment's ban on cruel and unusual punishments
 J. J. Atkins, a thoroughbred horse race for two-year-olds held in Brisbane, Australia

See also
Adkins